The Provisional Government of Saskatchewan was an independent state declared during the North-West Rebellion of 1885 in the District of Saskatchewan of the North-West Territories. It included parts of the present-day Canadian provinces of Alberta, Saskatchewan, and Manitoba. The name was given by Louis Riel. Although Riel initially hoped to rally the Countryborn, Cree, and European settlers of the Saskatchewan Valley to his banner, this did not occur. The government, with the exception of Honoré Jaxon and Chief White Cap, had an entirely French-speaking and Métis leadership. Gabriel Dumont was proclaimed adjutant general in which capacity he became supreme military commander, although Riel could, and did, override his tactical decisions. The Provisional Government was declared by Riel on March 19, 1885. It ceased to exist following the defeat of the Métis militarily during the Battle of Batoche, which concluded on May 20, 1885. During its existence the government only exercised authority over the Southbranch Settlements along the South Saskatchewan River. Other major centres in the area such as Prince Albert, Saskatoon, and most First Nations reserves remained outside of its control.

Exovedate

The governing council was named the Exovedate, Latin for "of the flock", and debated issues ranging from military policy to local bylaws and theological issues. It met at Batoche, Saskatchewan, and only exercised real authority during its existence over the Southbranch Settlement.

The provisional government collapsed with the fall of Batoche (see Battle of Batoche) and Riel was captured a few days later. Gabriel Dumont escaped to Montana.

Legacy

Batoche, where the Métis  Provisional Government had been formed, has been declared a National Historic Site.  Batoche marks the site of Gabriel Dumont's grave site, Albert Caron's House, Batoche school, Batoche cemetery, Letendre store, Gabriels river crossing, Gardepy's crossing, Batoche crossing, St. Antoine de Padoue Church, Métis rifle pits, and RNWMP battle camp.

In the spring of 2008, Tourism, Parks, Culture and Sport Minister Christine Tell proclaimed in Duck lake, that "the 125th commemoration, in 2010, of the 1885 North-West Resistance is an excellent opportunity to tell the story of the prairie Métis and First Nations peoples' struggle with Government forces and how it has shaped Canada today."

See also
 The Canadian Crown and Aboriginal peoples

References

External links
 Northwest Resistance: Chronology of Events, University of Saskatchewan Library

Political history of Saskatchewan
North-West Rebellion
19th century in Saskatchewan
1885 establishments in Canada
1880s disestablishments in Canada
1885 disestablishments in North America
Former countries in North America
Former unrecognized countries
Former republics
Provisional governments
States and territories established in 1885